William M. Hancock (died 1891) was a judge and state legislator in Mississippi. His father was Judge Jubal Braxton Hancock.

The Clarion-Ledger identified him as a Radical Republican in 1869. In 1877, it endorsed his nomination to be deputy collector noting his service during Democrat and Republican state governments. He served as postmaster in Meridian, Mississippi. Mary J. Hancock was nominated to take his place after his death in 1891.

Hancock served in the provisional legislature in 1870 as president pro-tem of the Mississippi Senate. John R. Lynch's book on Reconstruction reported him to be the only Republican legislator to vote against Hiram R. Revels as nominee to the U.S. Senate. Lynch said Hancock believed an African American could not legally serve in the body.

References

Mississippi state senators
Radical Republicans
Year of birth missing
1891 deaths